The Brown Apartments is a building complex located in downtown Portland, Oregon, listed on the National Register of Historic Places.

See also
 National Register of Historic Places listings in Southwest Portland, Oregon

References

External links

1915 establishments in Oregon
Colonial Revival architecture in Oregon
Goose Hollow, Portland, Oregon
Residential buildings completed in 1915
Apartment buildings on the National Register of Historic Places in Portland, Oregon
Portland Historic Landmarks